RealSports Boxing is a boxing based video game developed by Atari and released in 1987 for the Atari 2600. It is part of the RealSports series of games from Atari. The game has a side view of the ring, allowing the player to move up and down, as well as from left to right. There are four selectable characters in the game, Lefty O'Leary, Jabbin' Jack, Macho Man, or Iron Fists. The aim of the game is to knock out the opposition by filling up a bar at the bottom of the screen which allows the player to deliver the knock out blow. The game can be played with two players simultaneously.

Development 
After the North American video game crash of 1983 no more RealSports title were developed under the management of Warner Communications. After Jack Tramiel bought the Consumer Division of Atari, Inc. in 1984 and video game development got back into focus, it was decided that two more RealSports titles will be produced—RealSports Boxing and the Atari 7800 version of RealSports Baseball. The game was programmed by Alex DeMeo.

The game was heavily featured in the Atari 2600 Jr.'s advertisements.

The codebase of the game was later reused to create Absolute Entertainment's Title Match Pro Wrestling.

References

External links
RealSports Boxing at AtariMania

1987 video games
Boxing video games
Atari 2600 games
Atari games
Video games developed in the United States